Schore is the name of:

 Schore, Belgium, a village near Middelkerke
 Schore, Netherlands, a village in Zeeland
 Allan Schore, an American neuropsychologist
 Neil E. Schore, an American chemist